West Indies Associated States was the collective name for a number of islands in the Eastern Caribbean whose status changed from being British colonies to states in free association with the United Kingdom in 1967. These states were Antigua, Dominica, Grenada, Saint Christopher-Nevis-Anguilla, Saint Lucia, and Saint Vincent.

Associated statehood between these six territories and the UK was brought about by the West Indies Act 1967. Under the Act each state had full control over its constitution (and thus internal self-government), while the UK retained responsibility for external affairs and defence. The British monarch remained head of state, but the Governor now had only constitutional powers, and was often a local citizen. Many moved to change their flags from modified versions of the Blue Ensign to unique designs, with three – St. Vincent, St. Kitts-Nevis-Anguilla, and Grenada – adopting blue, green and yellow flags.

During the period of free association, all of the states participated in the West Indies Associated States Council of Ministers, the East Caribbean Common Market and Caribbean Free Trade Association (CARIFTA) (now superseded by the Caribbean Community). Cooperation between the eastern Caribbean states continued after the West Indies Associated States achieved separate independence, in the form of the Organisation of Eastern Caribbean States (the successor organisation).

*Anguilla left the Union of St Kitts-Nevis-Anguilla officially on 29 October 1980 and remained a British territory, leaving St Kitts and Nevis to achieve fully responsible status within the British Commonwealth.

Over time, the associated states moved to full independence, the first being  Grenada in 1974. This was followed by Dominica in 1978, Saint Lucia and Saint Vincent both in 1979, Antigua and Barbuda in 1981 and Saint Kitts and Nevis in 1983.

The moves towards independence were not always smooth, with separatist movements/campaigns occurring in Barbuda, Nevis and Anguilla. In Anguilla, this resulted in the secession of Anguilla from Saint Kitts-Nevis-Anguilla in 1969 and its reversion to British rule as a separate colony. During the 1970s, Nevis' local council wished to follow Anguilla's example, rather than become independent with Saint Kitts; however, the UK was opposed to Nevis becoming a separate colony and eventually the federation of Saint Kitts and Nevis became independent in 1983. In Barbuda, there was a campaign for separate independence from Antigua, but this was unsuccessful. All former associated states went on to keep the British monarchy and became Commonwealth realms, with the exception of Dominica. All former associated states also kept the Judicial Committee of the Privy Council as the highest court of appeal, with the exception of Dominica, which abolished it as the final court of appeal in 2015 with a constitutional amendment.

Of all of these islands that were once associated states, all are now independent, except for Anguilla within the former St. Kitts-Nevis-Anguilla, which is still a British Overseas Territory.

See also

 British West Indies
 Compagnie des Îles de l'Amérique
 Eastern Caribbean Supreme Court
 West Indies Federation (1958–1962)

References

External links

History of Anguilla
20th century in Antigua and Barbuda
History of Dominica
History of Grenada
History of British Saint Christopher and Nevis
History of British Saint Lucia
History of British Saint Vincent and the Grenadines
British West Indies
Antigua and Barbuda–United Kingdom relations
Dominica–United Kingdom relations
Grenada–United Kingdom relations
Saint Kitts and Nevis–United Kingdom relations
Saint Lucia–United Kingdom relations
Saint Vincent and the Grenadines–United Kingdom relations
Associated states
Organizations established in 1967
Organizations disestablished in 1983
States and territories established in 1967
States and territories disestablished in 1983
Former British colonies and protectorates in the Americas